The annual 2013 LKL All-star game, was held in Šiauliai Arena, in Šiauliai, on March 17.

Teams 

 Rimantas Kaukėnas was replaced by Gytis Sirutavičius, of Pieno žvaigždės, due to personal reasons. 
 Tremmell Darden was replaced by Chase Simon, of Šiauliai, due to his contract termination with Žalgiris.

Coaches 
"Lietuviai" was coached by Lithuanian Virginijus Šeškus, of Prienai, who acquired 4,866 votes. "Time Team" was coached by Spaniard Joan Plaza, of Žalgiris, who acquired 8,672 votes.

Game 

In the third quarter, singer Donatas Montvydas stepped on the court, wearing a "Lietuviai" jersey. In 5 minutes of action, he scored 6 points, and dished out 2 assists.

References 

Lietuvos krepšinio lyga All-Star Game
All Star